Ian Tarrant  (born Essex 1957) is an Anglican priest, the Dean of Gibraltar since 2020.

Tarrant was educated at Gonville and Caius College, Cambridge and at St John's College, Nottingham. He was ordained deacon in 1984 and priest in  1985.

After a curacy in Ealing he worked in the Democratic Republic of the Congo from 1988 to 1998. He was Senior Anglican Chaplain at the University of Nottingham from 1998 to 2009 and Rector of Woodford from then until his appointment as Dean.

References

1957 births
People from Essex
20th-century Anglican priests
Alumni of Gonville and Caius College, Cambridge
Deans of Gibraltar
Living people